Night of Passion is a song written by Robert Olausson, Maiti Alfonzetti, Sonja Aldén and Johan Lyander, and performed by The Poodles at Melodifestivalen 2006, ending up fourth.

Single record
The single was released on 13 March 2006 as the first single of the 2006 Poodles album "Metal Will Stand Tall". At the Swedish singles chart the song peaked at second position. The song also charted at Svensktoppen reaching a fifth position on 16 April 2006. On 2 July 2006 the song did its final Svensktoppen visit, peaking at fourth position twice during a chart visit lasting 12 weeks. In 2006 the song also charted at Trackslistan.

Other versions
The song was also performed at Dansbandskampen 2009 by Sannex in an acoustic version, when the Poodles and heavy metal was the theme of the night during the second competition of the year. Sannex also recorded the song on the album Får jag lov? 2011.

Single track listing
Night of Passion (radio mix) - 2:59 
Night of Passion (singback mix) - 2:59

Charts

Weekly charts

Year-end charts

References

2006 singles
English-language Swedish songs
Melodifestivalen songs of 2006
The Poodles songs
2006 songs
Songs written by Sonja Aldén